Fire and Sleet and Candlelight was a poetry anthology edited by August Derleth, and published in 1961 by Arkham House in an edition of 2,026 copies.  The title was suggested to Derleth by Lin Carter and is taken from the Lyke-Wake Dirge.  For this companion volume to Dark of the Moon: Poems of Fantasy and the Macabre, Derleth included only living poets or poems that had not been previously published.

Reprints
Freeport, NY: Books for Libraries Press, 1973.

References

1961 poetry books
1961 anthologies
American poetry anthologies
Arkham House books
Books by August Derleth
Fantasy poetry